Consumers' Association is a common name for consumer protection organizations and can refer to:

Australian Consumers Association
Fiji Consumers Association
Consumers' Association of Ireland
Which?, a United Kingdom consumer organization, officially known as Consumers' Association

See also
Consumer organization, for a list of consumer protection organizations